Matavla (Mätäwle) is a rural locality (a village) in Zaimkinsky Selsoviet, Duvansky District, Bashkortostan, Russia. The population was 101 as of 2010. There are 2 streets.

Geography 
Matavla is located 103 km northwest of Mesyagutovo (the district's administrative centre) by road. Ust-Ayaz is the nearest rural locality.

References 

Rural localities in Duvansky District